Russell Brookes (16 August 1945 – 30 October 2019) was a British rally driver. He won the British Rally Championship with a Ford Escort RS1800 in 1977 and with an Opel Manta 400 in 1985. In 1978, he won the Rally New Zealand, a round of the FIA Cup for Drivers, the predecessor to the World Championship for Drivers. In the World Rally Championship, he finished on the podium of his home event, the RAC Rally, three times in a row from 1977 to 1979.

Career
The only son of a firefighter, Brookes made his competitive debut in club events in 1963. At first he drove a number of privately entered cars including a BMC Mini Cooper. Progress was slow until 1973 without the support of family money in a sport which, at that time, did not permit sponsorship of individual cars. He then came to the attention of the Ford Motor Company Ltd when contesting their Ford Escort Mexico (One Make) championship.

In 1974, Brookes started one of the longest running sponsorship deals in motorsport when he signed with Andrews - Heat for Hire (a portable heating and air conditioning company). Their distinctive yellow colour scheme graced nearly all of his cars through to 1991. During this period the sponsors' turnover grew from £1.5m to over £60m making it a benchmark for other sponsorship deals.

In 1976, Brookes was invited to join the Ford 'works' team to drive an Escort RS1800 in the British Rally Championship. At that time the British Championship was highly competitive having eclipsed the World Rally Championship for publicity. Brookes found himself in formidable company not least from within the team, Björn Waldegård, Hannu Mikkola and Ari Vatanen (all world champions), being his team-mates. He won the Open Championship in 1977 and then stayed with Ford until the end of the 1979 World Rally Championship season.

Two years in the Talbot team followed before he joined Vauxhall/Opel dealer team, first in the Chevette HSR then the mighty Group B Opel Manta 400. The two years with the Opel Manta put Brookes head to head with his team mate Jimmy McRae (father of the late world champion Colin McRae). The needle match contest was more about the unofficial title of 'Top British Driver' than the championship itself. McRae won in 1984 and Brookes in 1985. The intensity of the contest lives in the memory of enthusiasts to this day.

After a year in the uncompetitive Vauxhall Astra and a one off event in a 'works' Lancia Delta Integrale Brookes rejoined Ford in 1988 for an assault on the British Rally Championship, championing first a Ford Sierra RS Cosworth. Latterly he drove a Ford Sapphire Cosworth 4x4 giving Ford their first international win with the new four wheel drive car. Here he stayed until the end of 1991 when he more or less retired from competitive rallying. Until shortly before his death, he was still making sporadic appearances in various cars on historic rallies and at motorsports events. In September 2008, Brookes took part in the Colin McRae Forest Stages Rally, a round of the Scottish Rally Championship centred in Perth in Scotland. He competed in the event in a historic Ford Escort RS1600. He was one of a number of ex-world and British champions to take part in the event in memory of McRae, who died in 2007.

Brookes died on 30 October 2019, at the age of 74 from injuries sustained from a bicycle accident.

References

External links

Rallybase stats page

1945 births
2019 deaths
English rally drivers
Sportspeople from Redditch
World Rally Championship drivers